Andrew Roy Philip Hunter (born 25 July 1986) is a British former competitive swimmer and freestyler who represented Great Britain at the Olympics, FINA world championships and European championships, and Scotland in the Commonwealth Games.

Hunter trained and studied at Millfield School from 2002 to 2004. At the 2008 Summer Olympics in Beijing, he swam for the British men's team in the 4×200-metre freestyle relay swimming, which came sixth in the event finals.

References

External links
  (archive)
 Andrew Hunter at British Swimming (archived)
 
 
 
 
 
 

1986 births
Living people
European Aquatics Championships medalists in swimming
British male freestyle swimmers
Medalists at the FINA World Swimming Championships (25 m)
Olympic swimmers of Great Britain
Scottish male swimmers
Swimmers at the 2008 Summer Olympics
Commonwealth Games medallists in swimming
Commonwealth Games silver medallists for Scotland
Universiade medalists in swimming
Swimmers at the 2006 Commonwealth Games
Swimmers at the 2010 Commonwealth Games
Universiade silver medalists for Great Britain
Medalists at the 2007 Summer Universiade
21st-century British people
People educated at Millfield
Medallists at the 2006 Commonwealth Games
Medallists at the 2010 Commonwealth Games